Columba Marmion, OSB, born Joseph Aloysius Marmion (April 1, 1858 – January 30, 1923) was a Benedictine Irish monk and the third Abbot of Maredsous Abbey in Belgium. Beatified by Pope John Paul II on September 3, 2000, Columba was one of the most popular and influential Catholic authors of the 20th century. His books are considered spiritual classics.

Early Years (1858–1886)

Columba was born in Queen Street, Dublin, Ireland on April 1, 1858, into a large and very religious family; three of his sisters became nuns. His father, William Marmion was from Clane, Co. Kildare. His mother, Herminie Cordier was French, prompting his biographer, Dom Raymond Thibaut to remark: "He owes to his Celtic origin his penetrating intelligence, his lively imagination, his sensibility, his exuberance and his youthful spirit. The French blood which ran in his veins contributes to his clearness of mind, his habit of clear perception, his ease of exposition, and his uprightness of character. From the combination of the two he derives his constant gaiety and his generosity of heart with all the strength, devotion, and fine feeling which this noble quality implies." He was baptised with the name "Joseph Aloysius". From a very early age he was seemingly "consumed with some kind of inner fire or enthusiasm for the things of God." He was educated at the Jesuit Belvedere College in Dublin.

He entered the seminary at the age of 16.  At the time he entered the seminary, his "faith was very strong"; he perceived "something more than simple theoretical theses" in Catholic doctrine, in particular "that a man's love for God is measured by his love for his neighbor."

One day during a vacation [at about the age of 17] he learnt that a poor old woman, well known to his family, was threatened with being summoned before the magistrates by an exacting creditor who claimed the payment of a somewhat large debt. The young seminarian possessed an equivalent amount saved up little by little for a trip he had promised himself. A struggle went on in his heart between his generosity and the legitimate desire to enjoy the fruit of his economies. This struggled lasted all night. In the morning charity had gained the day; with his father's consent he generously made over his savings in favor of the poor woman.

A "very important moment in Dom Marmion's inner life" occurred while he was still in seminary.

It seems that one day when returning to the study hall he had all at once, to use his own words, "a light on God's Infinity." While this "light" only lasted for an instant, it was so clear and strong that it left an indelible impression on him, so that... "he referred to this not without emotion and thanksgiving during the last days of his life."

He completed his studies in Rome at the Pontifical Irish College and was ordained in 1881.

On his journey back to Ireland, he passed through Maredsous, Belgium – a young and dynamic monastery founded 9 years before (in 1872) by Benedictine monks from the Abbey of Beuron, Germany.  He wished very much to join the community there.  But his archbishop in Ireland refused his request to do so and appointed him as curate at Dundrum, a parish in the south of Dublin. After a year, he was appointed Professor of Metaphysics at Holy Cross College at Clonliffe, the Dublin diocesan seminary where Marmion himself had studied. For the next four years (1882–1886) he embarked on the education and spiritual direction of others, including an appointment as chaplain to a nearby convent.

Parish priest

Marmion's work as a parish priest "daily brought him into contact with a cross-section of humanity," and he was "called upon to advise, teach, console and give every kind of spiritual and material aid."  He "possessed an extraordinary facility for adapting himself to other people," and above all "in comforting others and putting them at their ease." During this period he began to learn "the delicate art of spiritual direction in which he was later to excel."

His four years as professor at Clonliffe (1882–1886) "helped to complete his intellectual and spiritual formation. Thrown into the atmosphere of college life, he soon found himself in his native element."

Maredsous (1886–1899)

Marmion joined the monastic community at Maredsous in 1886, having received his archbishop's approval.  At first, it was very hard for him, even "traumatic."  He was 27 years old, a respected priest and professor. In Maredsous he was a novice, and had as well to learn a language (French) and monastic disciplines that were foreign to him.

After his Solemn Profession on February 10, 1891, Columba (as he was now called) was appointed to act as assistant to the Novice Master – with whom he got on rather badly – and in addition to preach at parishes in the vicinity of the Abbey.

"There was an element of the dramatic in his initiation into pastoral work. A neighboring parish priest, whose preacher had unexpectedly failed him on the eve of a great feast, came to the Benedictines to ask their help in his difficulty. The superior was very sorry, but he had no one to offer him except a young Irish monk whose French was far from perfect. 'I will take him all the same,' said the parish priest, and he brought off Dom Columba. Three days later he brought him back to the Abbey saying: 'We have never had such a preacher before in my parish.' And soon the other parish priests were competing with each other for 'the Irish father.'"

Monastic formation

During a season of "monastic calm" from 1891 to 1899, Marmion's spiritual life came "to full maturity" as he attended to "the various duties of the monastic state, the life of silence and recollection, of constant fidelity to the liturgy." Of particular importance to him were developing a spirit of obedience, compunction, and humility, as well as continued growth in the fundamental matters of faith, hope, and charity.

Above all, his spiritual life became more and more centered on Christ.

1887: After breakfast, while walking in the garden, I read the eighth chapter of The Imitation of Christ and I felt strongly impelled to take Jesus as my one friend. I realized that, in spite of my great weakness and unfaithfulness, Jesus desired to be my friend above all others. The text: "My delights are to be with the children of men" [Proverbs 8:31], gripped me and compelled me irresistibly to respond with all my heart to this desire of Jesus. In the course of this meditation I felt the near presence of Jesus and a great desire to do all things before His eyes.

1895: We are infinitely rich in Jesus Christ and God's mercies are to our miseries what the ocean is to a drop of water. We never glorify God more than when despite the sight of our sins and unworthiness we are so filled with confidence in His mercy and in the infinite merits of Jesus Christ that we throw ourselves on His bosom full of confidence and love, sure that He cannot repel us: "a humble and contrite heart, Oh God, Thou wilt not despise."

1896: Oh, my dear child, I would wish to engrave on your heart in letters of gold this truth, that no matter how great our misery, we are infinitely rich in Jesus Christ, if we unite with Him, if we lean on Him, if we realize constantly by a firm living faith that all the value of our prayer, and of all that we do comes from His merits in us.

Prior of Mont César, Louvain (1899–1909)
In 1899, Dom Columba helped to found the Abbey of Mont César, Louvain, Belgium, and became its first Prior.  He was invested with heavy responsibilities: Director of Studies for the young monks; Professor of Theology; spiritual director of Carmelite nuns, all in addition to being Prior.  He gave retreats in Belgium and the United Kingdom.  He also became confessor to the future Cardinal Mercier.

Marmion the teacher
Marmion's great gift for teaching came into full bloom during this period.  His lectures were distinguished by, "on the one hand, his extreme clearness, and on the other his happy and fluent application of doctrine to the inner life."  Rather than presenting "revealed truths like mere theorems of geometry having no bearing on the interior life," Marmion sought to inspire his students to "live in and by the mysteries he set forth to them."

The fruitful years in Mont César enabled him to attain an unrivalled mastery of his subjects. Others may surpass him in the detailed documentation of their learning; but when Dom Columba discusses one of the major theses in which dogma approaches the highest mysteries of God... his teaching has a breadth which approaches the infinite. The vast repercussions of his thought, the fruit of long contemplation, throw light on a whole world of secondary conclusions. His trenchant summaries unite with an unusual power of synthesis in one beam of light the diverse aspects of a problem hidden at the first approach in its complexity. The central point stands out in brilliant relief and the whole assembly of connected truths is illuminated by the light of a governing principle which is the key to the whole problem. As a master of synthesis he is unrivalled.

Abbot of Maredsous (1909–1923)

In 1893, Dom Hildebrand de Hemptinne, Second Abbot of Maredsous, was appointed by Pope Leo XIII as the first Abbot Primate of the Benedictine Order.  At the request of the Pope, Dom Hildebrand continued as Abbot of Maredsous, but relinquished that office in 1909.

In that year, at the age of 51, "at the height of his powers, both physical and intellectual," Dom Marmion was elected Third Abbot of Maredsous. A community consisting of a hundred monks, it ran two schools and was a publisher, in particular of La Revue bénédictine.  Marmion adopted as his motto Magis prodesse quam praesse, "To serve rather than be served," a maxim taken from the Rule of St. Benedict. The monastery had great spiritual and intellectual influence under his leadership.  Vocations abounded.  But Dom Marmion was not indifferent to temporal matters.  Thus he had the Abbey equipped with electricity and central heating, facilities rarely to be found in monasteries at that time.

"Gathering up all he had learnt during his priesthood of nearly thirty years and concentrating in his mind the treasures of theological science accumulated during as many years of study and teaching, a consummate master in dogmatics and asceticism, an experienced spiritual director, and a contemplative who constantly searched into the mysteries of God, Dom Marmion was now about to give the matured fruits of these years and to be above all among his own monks, the exponent of the Christian and monastic life in its fullness."

Maredsous and other communities
In 1909, the government of Belgium asked Maredsous to consider founding a Benedictine monastery in Katanga, in the Belgian Congo.  Doubtless Dom Marmion's missionary spirit would not have hesitated; but the Community preferred to devote itself to research and to promotion of sources of the faith, rather than to launch out into direct evangelization.  However, Marmion lent effective aid to this mission, which was taken on by the Abbey of Saint André at Bruges.

A few years later, Marmion gave help and support to the conversion to Catholicism of Anglican communities in Wales (Caldey and Milford Haven).

First World War (1914–1918)

When war broke out in 1914 Dom Marmion, fearing that his young novices might be called up, sent them to Ireland.  This involved Marmion traveling, disguised as a cattle dealer, through the war zone from Belgium to England, "without passport or papers of any kind." During the war years Marmion continued his activities as preacher and spiritual director.  In 1915 he wrote to a young man preparing for ordination: "The best of all preparations for the priesthood is to live each day with love, wherever obedience and Providence place us."

However, the Irish house, established at Edermine, did not give him entire satisfaction; the attitude of the young novices grieved him: "I have tried to win them by constancy and prayer, but so far without success.  They are good, but full of confidence in themselves... They oppose the letter of Canon Law to the spirit of the Holy Rule."  The Edermine house was closed in 1920.

The episode of the Dormition Monastery
After the war, the need to provide replacements for the German monks of the Beuronese congregation who had been expelled from the Benedictine Monastery of the Dormition, on Mount Zion in Jerusalem, made Marmion dream of there being a foundation from Maredsous in the Holy Land.

Despite his efforts and the support they gained, this dream was not realized and the German monks returned to the Dormition.

His writings
In 1895, Marmion gave a retreat for a small group of nuns. The notes for those talks contained in kernel an idea he would develop during the next 20 years – meditating upon it in prayer, and refining and polishing it in the many talks he gave as a popular retreat master.  In its finished form it became Christ, the Life of the Soul (1917) – a book that was first published privately, but then rapidly, unexpectedly, became an "overwhelming success" in the Catholic world.

At the time of its publication, much Catholic literature was a mere "rehash... of pious thoughts," marked by a "sentimental emphasis," and a tendency towards a sterile "refinement of interior analysis." "Little attention was paid to the Bible, the Fathers and the great masters of the spiritual life." In this atmosphere, Marmion's work seemed like "something new," even "revolutionary."  "It was as if the desert had received its long-awaited rain."  His books "initiated a profound spiritual revival the influence of which... permeated the whole Catholic world."

Yet there was essentially "nothing new" in Marmion's work.  Rather, his "revolution" was effected by "a return to what was fundamental," specifically his restoration of "Christ as the center of all... spiritual thinking."

A second major theme of his work is the doctrine of divine adoption in Christ.  Again, this idea was not original with Marmion; it is clearly set forth in the New Testament, particularly in the writings of St. Paul. But although the doctrine had been addressed by many spiritual writers before him, "it would be difficult to find another who had given the mystery such preeminence, making it, as he does, the beginning and the end of the spiritual life. And with Dom Marmion it is not so much a theory or a system, as a living truth that acts directly on the soul." Some believe the Catholic Church will one day formally declare Marmion the Doctor of Divine Adoption.

Sources for Marmion's thought include, preeminently, the Bible (especially St. Paul and St. John), the Church Fathers, St. Thomas Aquinas, and the Liturgy (i.e., the Mass, the Divine Office, the sacraments), as well as St. Francis de Sales (1567–1622) and Msgr. Charles Gay (1815–1880).

As a 20th-century writer, Marmion is notable, perhaps unique, in the several formal and informal endorsements his works have received from the popes of the 20th century, including Benedict XV (1914–1922), Pius XI (1922–1939), Pius XII (1939–1958), Paul VI (1963–1978), and John Paul II (1978–2005).

His last years

With Cardinal Mercier, his friend and confidant, Marmion was a spiritually dominant figure on the Belgian and international scene.  The publication of his books had met with "immediate and overwhelming success," and they were rapidly being translated into a number of languages, including Korean and Japanese.  His influence was at its height, despite his fatigue and a precarious state of health.

In September 1922, he took the place of the Bishop of Namur as leader of the diocesan pilgrimage to Lourdes.

In October of the same year, he presided at the celebration of the 50th anniversary of the foundation of Maredsous Abbey (which he had governed as abbot for 14 years).

Marmion was struck during a flu epidemic, and succumbed to bronchial pneumonia on January 30, 1923.

Beatification
Rapidly, favors and miracles were attributed to him; justifying the transfer, in 1963, of his body from the monks' cemetery to the abbatial church (his body was found to be incorrupt, after more than 40 years).  A cure from cancer obtained after a woman from St. Cloud, Minnesota, visited his tomb in 1966 was investigated by the Church and recognized as miraculous in 2000, leading to his beatification in that year.

Dom Columba Marmion was beatified on September 3, 2000 by Pope John Paul II, on the same occasion as:

 Pope John XXIII, who died in 1963
 Pope Pius IX, who died in 1878
 Tommaso Reggio, Archbishop of Genoa, who died in 1901
 William Chaminade, who died in 1850

At the Beatification ceremony Pope John Paul II declared:

He bequeathed to us an authentic treasury of spiritual teaching for the Church of our time.  In his writings he teaches a way of holiness, simple and yet demanding, for all the faithful, whom God, through love, has destined to be his adopted children in Christ Jesus...  May a wide rediscovery of the spiritual writings of Blessed Columba Marmion help priests, religious and laity to grow in union with Christ and bear faithful witness to Him through ardent love of God and generous service to their brothers and sisters.

May Blessed Columba Marmion help us to live ever more intensely, to understand ever more deeply, our membership in the Church, the Mystical Body of Christ!

Following the Beatification, Dom Marmion's Cause for Canonization has been opened and is very active.  Recently (2009) the Archdiocese of Vancouver, Canada, began a canonical investigation into the cure of a man ravaged by a necrotizing fasciitis.  He had been expected to die within hours.

Both Marmion Abbey and Marmion Academy (established 1933) in Aurora, Illinois are named in his honor.

Principal Works
Thanks to Dom Raymond Thibaut, his secretary, the central teachings of Columba, delivered orally in French, were memorialized in writing as follows:

 Le Christ, vie de l'âme (1917)
 Le Christ dans ses Mystères (1919)
 Le Christ, idéal du moine (1922)
 Le Christ, idéal du prêtre (1951)

These were translated into English, respectively, as follows:

 Christ, the Life of the Soul, English translation by "A Nun of Tyburn," i.e., Mother Mary St. Thomas, 1922
 Christ in His Mysteries, English translation by Mother Mary St. Thomas, 1924
 Christ the Ideal of the Monk, English translation by Mother Mary St. Thomas, 1926
 Christ the Ideal of the Priest, English translation by Dom Matthew Dillon, 1958

Posthumous Works Published in English
 Sponsa Verbi: The Virgin Consecrated to Christ, translated by Dom Francis Izard (London: Sands, 1925)
 Words of Life on the Margin of the Missal, edited by Dom Raymond Thibaut (St. Louis, Missouri: B. Herder Book Co., 1939)
 Union with God According to the Letters of Direction of Dom Marmion, by Dom Raymond Thibaut (London: Sands and Co., 1949)
 Suffering with Christ: An Anthology of the Writings of Dom Columba Marmion, compiled by Dom Raymond Thibaut (Westminster, Maryland: The Newman Press, 1952)
 The Trinity in Our Spiritual Life: An Anthology of the Writings of Dom Columba Marmion, compiled by Dom Raymond Thibaut (Westminster, Maryland: The Newman Press, 1953)
 The English Letters of Abbot Marmion, 1858-1923 (Baltimore, Maryland: Helicon Press, 1962)
 Fire of Love: An Anthology of Abbot Marmion's Published Writings on the Holy Spirit, edited by Charles Dollen (St. Louis, Missouri: B. Herder Book Co., 1964)

English Translations in Print
 Christ, the Life of the Soul.  A new translation by Alan Bancroft. Introduction by Dom Mark Tierney, OSB (European Vice-Postulator of Marmion's Beatification Cause). Foreword by Fr. Benedict Groeschel, CFR (Bethesda, Maryland: Zaccheus Press, 2005) (in North America) and (Leominster, UK: Gracewing, 2005) (outside North America).
 Christ in His Mysteries.  A new translation by Alan Bancroft. Introduction by Aidan Nichols, OP; Foreword by Fr. Benedict Groeschel, CFR. (Bethesda, Maryland: Zaccheus Press, 2008) (in North America) and (Leominster, UK: Gracewing, 2010) (outside North America); both publishers' editions are available in Australasia.
 Christ the Ideal of the Monk. Reprint of the Mother Mary St. Thomas translation. (Ridgefield, Connecticut: Roman Catholic Books, circa 2005)
 Christ the Ideal of the Priest. Reprint of the Dom Matthew Dillon translation, with adaptations made by Rev. David L. Toups, STD. (San Francisco, California: Ignatius Press, 2005) (in North America) and (Leominster, UK: Gracewing, 2006) (in the United Kingdom)
 Union with God: Letters of Spiritual Direction by Blessed Columba Marmion.  Reprint of the Mother Mary St. Thomas translation, with an introduction by Rev. David L. Toups, STD. (Bethesda, Maryland: Zaccheus Press, 2006)
 Columba Marmion: Correspondance 1881–1923. Edited by Mark Tierney, R.-Ferdinand Poswick, and Nicolas Dayez. (Paris: François-Xavier de Guibert, 2008)

Footnotes

References
 
 
 
 
 Philipon, MM, OP, The Spiritual Doctrine of Dom Marmion, trans. Dom Matthew Dillon (Westminster, Md.: The Newman Press, 1956).
 Rigali, Justin F., Cardinal, "Blessed Columba Marmion: Doctor of Divine Adoption" in Josephinum, vol. 13:2 (2006): 132–142.

Other Books
 Ph. Nyssens-Braun, Dom Columba Marmion intime. Editions Ramgal, Thuillies, and Maison Casterman. 1939.

External links
 Biography in the Vatican's website
 Official Site of the Postulation of the Cause of Blessed Columba Marmion
 Works by and about Dom Marmion
 Select Bibliography

Irish beatified people
Irish Benedictines
Belgian Benedictines
Benedictine abbots
Belgian abbots
1858 births
1923 deaths
19th-century Irish people
People from County Dublin
Alumni of Clonliffe College
Beatifications by Pope John Paul II
Venerated Catholics by Pope John Paul II
People educated at Belvedere College